Te Korowai-o-Te-Tonga Peninsula, also known as South Head and by its former name of the South Kaipara Peninsula, is a long peninsula in the North Island of New Zealand, extending north along the western edge of the Kaipara Harbour for some  from near Helensville to the harbour's mouth. The peninsula was officially renamed in 2013 as part of a Treaty of Waitangi settlement. The name, which is Māori for "The cloak of the south", reflects the peninsula's geographical role in guarding the southern half of the Kaipara Harbour from the Tasman Sea and prevailing westerly winds. The mouth of the Kaipara Harbour separates the peninsula from the larger Pouto Peninsula to the north.

Geography

It is bounded in the west by the Tasman Sea, with the long beaches of Te Oneone Rangatira Beach and Muriwai Beach along its Tasman coast. The settlement of Muriwai lies immediately to the south of the peninsula.

The peninsula is a sand dune that formed geologically very recently, within the last two million years.

Inland from the Tasman Sea coast is the long strip of Woodhill Forest, which is bounded in the east by a string of low-lying lakes, of which the largest and northernmost is Lake Rototoa. The lakes were traditionally Ngā Tapuwae o Kawharu, "The Footsteps of Kawharu", referring to the famed Tainui warrior Kawharu, who was asked by Ngāti Whātua to travel to the South Kaipara area to assist them in military conflicts. The lakes are an important habitat for many bird species, such as the New Zealand grebe, New Zealand scaup.

To the peninsula's east lie numerous small streams and inlets which feed Kaipara Harbour. The northern tip of the peninsula is dominated by a large area of sand and mud, known as the Papakanui Spit and the Waionui Inlet. The sandspit is a roosting site for many migratory wading bird species.

The northwest of the peninsula, adjacent to the Papakanui Spit, is an extensive sand dune used by the New Zealand Defence Force for weapons training.

History

The Waionui Inlet to the north of the peninsula is the site of a number of middens dating to the archaic period of Māori history. European settlers began purchasing land on the peninsula from the 1870s. In the 1880s, Alfred Buckland developed much of the peninsula as a cattle run. The land was subdivided into individual farming blocks in the 1920s.

Demographics
South Head statistical area covers the entire peninsula, including the settlement of Shelly Beach, but does not include Parakai or Helensville.

South Head had a population of 2,595 at the 2018 New Zealand census, an increase of 555 people (27.2%) since the 2013 census, and an increase of 717 people (38.2%) since the 2006 census. There were 903 households, comprising 1,317 males and 1,281 females, giving a sex ratio of 1.03 males per female. The median age was 42.2 years (compared with 37.4 years nationally), with 546 people (21.0%) aged under 15 years, 384 (14.8%) aged 15 to 29, 1,278 (49.2%) aged 30 to 64, and 387 (14.9%) aged 65 or older.

Ethnicities were 87.7% European/Pākehā, 18.6% Māori, 3.9% Pacific peoples, 2.9% Asian, and 2.1% other ethnicities. People may identify with more than one ethnicity.

The percentage of people born overseas was 18.2, compared with 27.1% nationally.

Although some people chose not to answer the census's question about religious affiliation, 60.8% had no religion, 28.0% were Christian, 2.1% had Māori religious beliefs, 0.1% were Hindu, 0.2% were Muslim, 0.2% were Buddhist and 1.4% had other religions.

Of those at least 15 years old, 327 (16.0%) people had a bachelor's or higher degree, and 375 (18.3%) people had no formal qualifications. The median income was $31,900, compared with $31,800 nationally. 390 people (19.0%) earned over $70,000 compared to 17.2% nationally. The employment status of those at least 15 was that 1,083 (52.9%) people were employed full-time, 330 (16.1%) were part-time, and 54 (2.6%) were unemployed.

See also
Waioneke

References

Peninsulas of the Auckland Region
Rodney Local Board Area
Kaipara Harbour